The Vision Tower is a 51-floor tower in the Business Bay in Dubai, United Arab Emirates. The tower has a total structural height of 260 m (853 ft). Construction of the Vision Tower was completed in January 2011.

See also 
 List of tallest buildings in Dubai

External links

The Vision Tower on Emporis

High-tech architecture
Postmodern architecture
Office buildings completed in 2011
Skyscraper office buildings in Dubai